Shewanella corallii is a Gram-negative, rod-shaped and motile bacterium from the genus of Shewanella which has been isolated from a Red Sea coral from the Gulf of Eilat in Israel.

References

Alteromonadales
Bacteria described in 2010